Abdul Nabi Bangash (Urdu: عبدالنبی بنگش b. August 1954) is a Pakistani politician, businessman and member of the Senate of Pakistan, currently serving as chairperson of the Senate Committee on Federal Education and Professional Training. He belongs to Awami National Party.

Political career
Born to a business family in Hangu district, he got his early education from Govt. College Kohat, where he joined the Pakhtoon Student Federation (the student wing of ANP) and later the ANP. He was elected to the Senate of Pakistan on a general seat as an ANP candidate in March 2009. He is the chairperson of the Senate Committee on Federal Education and Professional Training and member of senate committees of Petroleum and Natural Resources, Housing and Works, Overseas Pakistanis and Human Resource Development, Employees Welfare Fund.

See also
 List of Senators of Pakistan
 Ayatullah Durrani
 Abdul Haseeb Khan

References

External links
Abdul Nabi Bangash Official Site
ANP official Website

Living people
Members of the Senate of Pakistan
1954 births
Awami National Party politicians